Old St Paul's Anglican Church is a heritage-listed former Anglican church at Cressy Street (South), Deniliquin, Edward River Council, New South Wales, Australia. The property is owned by the Edward River Council. It was added to the New South Wales State Heritage Register on 2 April 1999.

History 
Subscriptions were collected from town and district Anglicans about 1857 to build a house for a minister, and eventually a church. Christ Church was built on the corner of George and Macauley Streets. Several services were held in the church before it was consecrated. On 22 October 1861, a week after the consecration, it was destroyed in a storm. The next church service was held in the Masonic Hall.

The foundation stone of St Paul's was laid in 1866. The church was designed by Melbourne architects Smith & Watson and built in 1866 by John Taylor. It was opened by the local rector Rev. Samuel Harper in November 1866, but was not formally consecrated by the Bishop of Goulburn until May1873. The church was used until 1977 when a new church was opened on the  site of the old Anglican Rectory at the junction of Poictiers, Wellington and Harrison Streets.

The church was used until 1977, when a new church was built on the site of the old Anglican rectory. It underwent major restoration in the early 1990s due to the impact of general decay and vandalism.

The Victorian Academic Gothic style church and sunday school buildings underwent extensive conservation work in the early 1990s under the auspices of Heritage Council of New South Wales.  Vandals had contributed to the overall decay which had taken over the buildings. The slate roof of the church has been replaced, brickwork reinstated, doors and stained glass windows restored or replaced. The interior has also underwent major refurbishment.

It is now operated by the Edward River Council as the Multi-Arts Centre, an arts centre and community hall.

Heritage listing 
St Paul's Anglican Church was listed on the New South Wales State Heritage Register on 2 April 1999.

See also 

 List of former churches in Australia

References

Bibliography

Attribution

External links

Deniliquin
Deniliquin
Anglican churches in New South Wales
Articles incorporating text from the New South Wales State Heritage Register
Deniliquin
Churches completed in 1866
1866 establishments in Australia
1977 disestablishments in Australia
New South Wales Heritage Database
Sunday schools
Community buildings in New South Wales
Articles incorporating text from the New South Wales Heritage Database